The Potez XV (also erroneously written Potez 15) was a French single-engine, two-seat observation biplane designed as a private venture by Louis Coroller and built by Potez and under licence in Poland.

Design and development
The aircraft was designed in the beginning of the 1920s by Henry Coroller in Potez works. It was a development of a fighter SEA IV built by Société d'Etudes Aéronautiques, a former firm of Henry Potez and Coroller. A prototype was flown in October 1921 and shown at Paris Air Show that year. It was conventional biplane with a fixed tailskid landing gear and a nose-mounted 276 kW (370 hp) Lorraine 12D engine. The engine was later replaced by a 224 kW (300 hp) Renault 12Fe.

After a successful evaluation, the aircraft was ordered by the Aéronautique Militiare as a reconnaissance aircraft. The first aircraft were manufactured and delivered in late 1923.

Series-built aircraft were powered with Lorraine-Dietrich 12Db V-12 engines. 410 were built in France. The aircraft was built in two main military variants: Potez XV A.2 reconnaissance aircraft and Potez XV B.2 bomber-reconnaissance aircraft. A single prototype of a floatplane variant Potez XV HO.2 was built. There was also an export variant Potez XVII of 1923, built for Bulgaria only, with the same LD 12Db engine.

Already in 1923, Poland bought a licence for the Potez 15 and started to manufacture them in Podlaska Wytwórnia Samolotów (PWS, 35 built in 1925) and Plage i Laśkiewicz aircraft works (100 built in 1925-1926).

A development of Potez XV was Potez 27,

Operational history

Primary user of Potez 15s was the French Air Force, from late 1923. Main user became the Polish Air Force with 110 aircraft bought and 135 manufactured in Poland.

In the Polish Air Force, they were used from late 1924. Their withdrawal from combat units started in 1927, then they were used for training until mid-1930s.

120 aircraft were sold to Romania, 12 to Spain, and eight to Denmark. Six Potez XVIIs were sold to  Bulgaria. 25 Potez XV A.2 were used in Yugoslavia. These shared the engine, fuselage, undercarriage and tailfin of the Potez XV, combining them with the wings and stabilizers from a newer design, the 25.

Description
Wooden construction biplane with fixed landing gear. The fuselage was framed, with metal covering for front engine section, plywood covering for the midsection and canvas covering for the tail section. Rectangular two-spar wings, plywood (leading edge) and canvas covered, of equal span. Crew of two, sitting in tandem in open cockpits: pilot in front, observer in the rear. Conventional fixed landing gear, with a common straight axle and a rear skid. Engine in front, two barrel-type water Lamblin radiators below the fuselage, between the landing gear. Two-blade wooden propeller. Fuel tanks in the fuselage. The pilot had one fixed 7.7 mm (.303 in) Vickers machine gun with an interrupter gear, the observer had twin 7.7 mm (.303 in) Lewis Guns on a ring mounting.

Variants
Potez XV
Production variant powered by a  Lorraine-Dietrich 12Db V-12 engine.
Potez XV HO.2
A 2-seat observation floatplane variant powered by a  Lorraine-Dietrich 12Db V-12 engine.
Potez XVII
Modified variant for Bulgaria, six built.

Operators

Bulgarian Air Force

Royal Danish Air Force

French Air Force
French Navy

Polish Air Force

Royal Romanian Air Force

Royal Yugoslav Air Force

Specifications

See also

References

Bibliography

External links

Potez 15 at Ugolok Neba (translated page)
Potez 15 at Aviafrance

1920s French military reconnaissance aircraft
1920s French bomber aircraft
015
Single-engined tractor aircraft
Biplanes
Aircraft first flown in 1921